Flamarion Jovinho Filho (born 30 July 1996), known as Flamarion Junior or simply Flamarion, is a Brazilian football player who plays for Erovnuli Liga club Dinamo Batumi.

Club career

Dinamo Batumi
In 2017 he played 21 games for Dinamo Batumi without scoring. In 2018 he scored 24 goals in 31 games. In 2019 he scored 17 goals in 30 games. At the first 8 games in 2020 he scored 4 goals.

Rotor Volgograd
On 7 September 2020, he joined Russian Premier League club FC Rotor Volgograd on loan. He made his Russian Premier League debut for Rotor on 27 September 2020 in a game against FC Rubin Kazan and scored a goal in a 1–3 home defeat.

Career statistics

Club

References

External links
 
 

1996 births
Living people
Brazilian footballers
Association football forwards
FK Lovćen players
FC Dinamo Batumi players
FC Rotor Volgograd players
Montenegrin First League players
Erovnuli Liga players
Russian Premier League players
Brazilian expatriate footballers
Expatriate footballers in Montenegro
Expatriate footballers in Georgia (country)
Expatriate footballers in Russia
Brazilian expatriate sportspeople in Georgia (country)